Behemoth (bəhēmōṯ) is a beast from the biblical Book of Job, and is a form of the primeval chaos-monster created by God at the beginning of creation; he is paired with the other chaos-monster, Leviathan, and according to later Jewish tradition both would become food for the righteous at the end-time. Metaphorically, the name has come to be used for any extremely large or powerful entity.

Etymology
The Hebrew word behemoth has the same form as the plural of the Hebrew noun בהמה behemah meaning 'beast', suggesting an augmentative meaning 'great beast'. However, some theorize that the word might originate from an Egyptian word of the form pꜣ jḥ mw 'the water-ox' meaning 'hippopotamus', altered by folk etymology in Hebrew to resemble behemah. However, this phrase with this meaning is unattested at any stage of Egyptian.

Biblical description

Behemoth is mentioned in a speech from the mouth of God in chapter 40 of the Book of Job, a primeval creature created by God and so powerful that only God can overcome him:

Job 40 
15 Behold, Behemoth, which I made as I made you; he eats grass like an ox.
16 Behold, his strength in his loins, and his power in the muscles of his belly.
17 He makes his tail stiff like a cedar; the sinews of his thighs are knit together.
18 His bones are tubes of bronze, his limbs like bars of iron.
19 He is the first of the works of God; let him who made him bring near his sword!
20 For the mountains yield food for him where all the wild beasts play.
21 Under the lotus plants, he lies, in the shelter of the reeds and in the marsh.
22 For his shade, the lotus trees cover him; the willows of the brook surround him.
23 Behold, if the river is turbulent, he is not frightened; he is confident though Jordan rushes against his mouth.
24 Can one take him by his eyes, or pierce his nose with a snare? (ESV)

The passage pairs Behemoth with the sea-monster Leviathan, both composite mythical creatures with enormous strength which humans like Job could not hope to control, yet both reduced to the status of divine pets.

These beasts make an appearance in Revelation 13, as they try to fight against God and can be only slain by God (Thessalonians 2:8/Revelation 19: 19-20), both these beast are extremely strong, unruly and untamable in nature. In Revelation 13:11-12, “Then I saw another beast coming up out of the earth; and he had two horns like a lamb and he spoke as a dragon. 12 He exercises all the authority of the first beast in his presence. And he makes the earth and those who dwell in it to worship the first beast, whose fatal wound was healed".

Later interpretations
In Jewish apocrypha and pseudepigrapha, such as the 2nd century BC Book of Enoch (60:7–10), Behemoth is the unconquerable male land-monster, living in an invisible desert east of the Garden of Eden, as Leviathan is the primeval female sea-monster, dwelling in "the Abyss", and Ziz the primordial sky-monster. Similarly, in the most ancient section of the Second Book of Esdras (6:47–52), written around 100 AD (3:1), the two are described as inhabiting the mountains and the seas, respectively, after being separated from each other, due to the sea's insufficiency to contain them both. Likewise, in the contemporary Syriac Apocalypse of Baruch (29:4), it is stated that Behemoth will come forth from his seclusion on land, and Leviathan out of the sea, and the two gigantic monsters, created on the fifth day, will serve as food for the elect, who will survive in the days of the Messiah.

A Jewish rabbinic legend describes a great battle which will take place between them at the end of time: "they will interlock with one another and engage in combat, with his horns the Behemoth will gore with strength, the fish [Leviathan] will leap to meet him with his fins, with power. Their Creator will approach them with his mighty sword [and slay them both];" then, "from the beautiful skin of the Leviathan, God will construct canopies to shelter the righteous, who will eat the meat of the Behemoth and the Leviathan amid great joy and merriment." In the Haggadah, Behemoth's strength reaches its peak on the summer solstice of every solar year (around 21 June). At this time of year, Behemoth lets out a loud roar that makes all animals tremble with fear, and thus renders them less ferocious for a whole year. As a result, weak animals live in safety away from the reach of wild animals. This mythical phenomenon is shown as an example of divine mercy and goodness. Without Behemoth's roar, traditions narrate, animals would grow more wild and ferocious, and hence go around butchering each other and humans.

Modern interpretations of Behemoth tend to fall into several categories: 
 Behemoth is an animal of the modern natural world, most often the hippopotamus (e.g. in Russian where the word "begemot" refers more often to hippopotamus rather than the Biblical animal), although the elephant and water buffalo could also be candidates. All three consume grass and chew it as an ox would, and have mobile, sprucy tails that sway in a similar manner to a Lebanese cedar-tree.
 Behemoth was an invention of the poet who wrote the Book of Job.
 Behemoth and Leviathan were both separate mythical chaos-beasts.

In 2003, French scientists working in Baluchistan, Pakistan discovered the complete remains of an extinct variety of rhinoceros called a Baluchitherium, which was much larger and matched the physical description given in Job.

Additionally, some creationist fundamentalists, such as the Christian organization Answers in Genesis, claim that the Behemoth is some species of sauropod or other dinosaur based on the comparison of the tail to a cedar tree. This view is often criticized and discredited based on classical (it is not supported by the text) or scientific grounds (Homo sapiens didn't live on Earth until 66.5 million years after the dinosaurs died out).

Literary references

The 17th-century political philosopher Thomas Hobbes named the Long Parliament 'Behemoth' in his book Behemoth. It accompanies his book of political theory that draws on the lessons of English Civil War, the rather more famous Leviathan.

The Dictionnaire Infernal version of Behemoth is a demon that resembles a round-bellied humanoid elephant. He works as the infernal watchman for Satan and oversees the banquets in Hell while having a good singing voice.

The Behemoth is also mentioned in the opera, Nixon in China, composed by John Adams, and written by Alice Goodman. At the beginning of the first act, the chorus sings "The people are the heroes now, Behemoth pulls the peasants' plow" several times.

The Russian writer Mikhail Bulgakov used a demonic cat with the name Behemoth as a character in his novel The Master and Margarita. In the book the cat could speak, walk on two legs and was part of the entourage of Woland who represented Satan.

See also

 Bahamut
 Bambotus, ancient name for the Senegal River
 The Beast (Revelation), two beasts described in the New Testament
 Dābbat al-Arḍ
 Book of Job in Byzantine illuminated manuscripts
 The Giant Behemoth, an American-British science fiction giant monster film
 Tarasque
 Behemoth (novel), novel by Scott Westerfeld

References

Citations

Bibliography 

 
 
 
 

Animals in the Bible
Hebrew words and phrases in the Hebrew Bible
Jewish legendary creatures
Christian legendary creatures
Islamic legendary creatures
Book of Job
Mythological monsters